Handley Regional Library System serves the city of Winchester and counties of Frederick and Clarke in Virginia. The library system is within Region 6 of Virginia Library Association (VLA).

Service area 
According to the FY 2014 Institute of Museum and Library Services Data Catalog, the Library System has a service area population of 119,534 with one central library and two branch libraries.

Branches 

 Bowman Library (Stephens City) established 2001.
 Clarke County Library (Berryville) established in 1985.
 Handley Library (Winchester) established 1913.

References

External links 
 Handley Regional Library System
 Handley Regional Library System Facebook page
 Friends of Handley Regional Library

Libraries in Virginia
Education in Winchester, Virginia
Education in Clarke County, Virginia
Education in Frederick County, Virginia